"My Old Friend" is a song written by Craig Wiseman and Steve McEwan, and recorded by American country music artist Tim McGraw.  It was released in September 2005 as the fifth and final single from his album Live Like You Were Dying.  It peaked at number 6 on the country music charts.

Critical reception
Kevin John Coyne, reviewing the song for Country Universe, gave it a positive rating. He summed up the review by saying that it is "one of the best singles of his career".

Chart positions
The song debuted at number 55 on the U.S. Billboard Hot Country Singles & Tracks for the week ending October 8, 2005.

Year-end charts

References

2005 singles
2005 songs
Tim McGraw songs
Songs written by Craig Wiseman
Songs written by Steve McEwan
Song recordings produced by Byron Gallimore
Song recordings produced by Tim McGraw
Curb Records singles